Lewis Ransom Foster (August 5, 1898 – June 10, 1974) was an American screenwriter, film/television director, and film/television producer. He directed and wrote over one hundred films and television series between 1926 and 1960.

Selected filmography

Director
 Double Whoopee (1929)
 Berth Marks (1929)
 Angora Love (1929)
 Dizzy Dates (1930)
 Blondes Prefer Bonds (1931)
 Love Letters of a Star (1936)
 The Man Who Cried Wolf (1937)
 El Paso (1949)
 The Lucky Stiff (1949)
 Manhandled (1949)
 Captain China (1950)
 Passage West (1951)
 Hong Kong (1952)
 Tropic Zone (1953)
 Those Redheads From Seattle (1953) filmed in 3-D
 Four Star Playhouse (1 episode, 1954)
 Crashout (1955)
 The Bold and the Brave (1956)
 Cavalcade of America (2 episodes, 1955–1956)
 The Adventures of Jim Bowie (21 episodes, 1956–1957)
 Tonka (1958)
 The Wonderful World of Disney (8 episodes, 1957–1960)

Writer
 The Merry Widower (1926)
 Wrong Again (Story, 1929)
 Broken Wedding Bells (1930)
 The Great Pie Mystery (1931)
 Air Eagles (1931)
 The Girl in the Tonneau (1932)
 Cheating Blondes (1933)
 Stolen Harmony (1935)
 Two in a Crowd (1936)
 The Magnificent Brute (1936)
 She's Dangerous (1937)
 Tom Sawyer, Detective (1938)
 Mr. Smith Goes to Washington (Story, 1939)
 Million Dollar Legs (1939)
 Golden Gloves (1940)
 The Farmer's Daughter (1940)
 Adventure in Washington (1941)
 I Live on Danger (1942)
 Alaska Highway (1943)
 The More The Merrier (1943)
 Can't Help Singing (1944)
 It's in the Bag! (1945)
 I Wonder Who's Kissing Her Now (1947)
 The Lucky Stiff (1949)
 The Eagle and the Hawk (1950)
 Crosswinds (1951)
 The Blazing Forest (1952)
 Crashout (1955)
 The Adventures of Jim Bowie (5 episodes, 1956)
 Tales of Wells Fargo (2 episodes, 1957–1961)
 The Wonderful World of Disney (3 episodes, 1959–1960)

Awards and nominations

External links

1898 births
1974 deaths
People from Brookfield, Missouri
American male screenwriters
American television directors
Film producers from Missouri
American television composers
Burials at Forest Lawn Memorial Park (Glendale)
Film directors from Missouri
Best Story Academy Award winners
20th-century American composers
Screenwriters from Missouri
20th-century American male writers
20th-century American screenwriters
Television producers from Missouri